Glenea keili is a species of beetle in the family Cerambycidae. It was described by Ritsema in 1897. It contains the varietas Glenea keili var. pyrrha.

References

keili
Beetles described in 1897